Boston Theatre may refer to:

Boston, Massachusetts, USA
 Federal Street Theatre (1793-1852), also known as the Boston Theatre, corner of Federal St. and Franklin St.
 The Boston Theatre (1854-1925), no.539 Washington St.
 Keith-Albee Boston Theatre (1925-1930s), no.616 Washington St., corner of Essex St.